Ithaca station could refer to:

 Lehigh Valley Railroad Station (Ithaca, New York), a defunct train station in Ithaca, New York
 Ithaca Bus Station, a bus station in Ithaca, New York
 Ithaca Fire Station, a defunct fire station in Paddington, Queensland